Honduras has competed in eleven Summer Olympic Games. They competed at the Winter Olympic Games in 1992, but have yet to appear since then.  They have never won a medal; their best performance was 4th place in men's football at the 2016 Summer Olympics, losing to Nigeria 3-2 in the bronze medal match.

The Comité Olímpico Hondureño was formed in 1956 and recognized by the IOC the same year.

Medal tables

Medals by Summer Games

Medals by Winter Games

See also
 List of flag bearers for Honduras at the Olympics
 Tropical nations at the Winter Olympics
 Honduras at the Paralympics

External links